The 2019 College Football Playoff National Championship was a college football bowl game that determined a national champion in the NCAA Division I Football Bowl Subdivision for the 2018 season. It was played at Levi's Stadium in Santa Clara, California, on January 7, 2019, and, aside from any all star games that followed, was the culminating game of the 2018–19 bowl season. Sponsored by telecommunications company AT&T, the game was officially known as the 2019 College Football Playoff National Championship presented by AT&T.

The Clemson Tigers defeated the Alabama Crimson Tide by a score of 44–16 to win the championship with an undefeated 15–0 record. Clemson became the first such undefeated team in the CFP era to win the title, and the first to finish 15–0 in a single season since the 1897 Penn Quakers. The 28-point loss was the largest margin of defeat for Alabama during the Nick Saban era (since 2007) and since Alabama's 31-point loss in the 1998 Music City Bowl.

Background
Levi's Stadium in Santa Clara, California, was announced as the host site for the fifth College Football Playoff National Championship on November 4, 2015. Atlanta was awarded the 2018 championship game while New Orleans was awarded the 2020 game. The three game sites were chosen out of nine bids, with bids by Houston, South Florida, Charlotte, Detroit, Minnesota, and San Antonio not selected.

2019 College Football Playoff

The College Football Playoff selection committee selected four teams to advance to the playoff. The bowl selection show took place on December 2. The top-ranked Alabama Crimson Tide faced the fourth-ranked Oklahoma Sooners in the Orange Bowl and the second-ranked Clemson Tigers faced the third-ranked Notre Dame Fighting Irish in the Cotton Bowl, both held on December 29. Alabama defeated Oklahoma, 45–34, and Clemson defeated Notre Dame, 30–3.

Teams
Alabama held a 14–4 series lead over Clemson in prior meetings between the two teams. They had met in the postseason in each of the prior three seasons: the 2016 College Football Playoff National Championship, won by Alabama (45–40); the 2017 College Football Playoff National Championship, won by Clemson (35–31); and the 2018 Sugar Bowl playoff semifinal game, won by Alabama (24–6).

This was the first time under the College Football Playoff format (initiated in 2014) that an undefeated team won the championship, as both teams came into the game 14–0. The most recent prior matchup of undefeated teams in a championship game had been the 2011 BCS National Championship Game, which saw 13–0 Auburn defeat 12–0 Oregon. The most recent undefeated winner of a national championship game had been Florida State, who won the 2014 BCS National Championship Game and finished their season with a 14–0 record.

Clemson Tigers

Clemson defeated the Pittsburgh Panthers in the 2018 ACC Championship Game on December 1, then received their bid to the Cotton Bowl with the release of final CFP rankings on December 2. Clemson defeated the Notre Dame Fighting Irish in the Cotton Bowl Classic on December 29 to advance to the championship game. The Tigers entered the championship game with a 14–0 record. On January 3, it was confirmed that three Clemson players, including starting defensive lineman Dexter Lawrence, would remain suspended from playing by the NCAA, due to drug testing in advance of the Cotton Bowl Classic that showed "trace amounts of a banned substance", which was identified as ostarine.

Alabama Crimson Tide

Alabama defeated the Georgia Bulldogs in the 2018 SEC Championship Game on December 1, then received their bid to the Orange Bowl with the release of final CFP rankings on December 2. Alabama defeated the Oklahoma Sooners in the Orange Bowl on December 29 to advance to the championship game. The Crimson Tide also entered the championship game with a 14–0 record. On December 27, in advance of the Orange Bowl, three Alabama players, including starting offensive lineman Deonte Brown, were suspended for the remainder of the season, in what was initially described as an unspecified violation of team rules, then later characterized as NCAA violations.

Starting lineups

Source:

Game summary
After winning the coin toss, Alabama elected to defer, giving Clemson the ball to start the game. The Tigers' opening drive resulted in a three-and-out, and Alabama took over on their own 21-yard-line following a punt. However, three plays later the scoring was opened by Clemson cornerback A. J. Terrell, who intercepted a Tua Tagovailoa pass and returned it 44 yards for a touchdown. Alabama responded quickly, as Tagovailoa made up for the interception three plays later by finding Jerry Jeudy downfield for a 62-yard score. On their ensuing drive, Clemson continued the offensive trend of the first quarter with a 62-yard pass of their own, from Trevor Lawrence to Tee Higgins, which set up a 17-yard touchdown rush by Travis Etienne on the next play. Now trailing 14–7, Alabama marched downfield on their next drive, covering 75 yards in ten plays, to score a touchdown with opportunity to tie the game. However, Alabama freshman placekicker Joseph Bulovas missed the extra point, hitting the right upright; this was his sixth missed extra point of the season and left Clemson ahead by one, 14–13. Clemson's ensuing drive resulted in another three-and-out; they punted to Alabama, who made it to the Clemson 3-yard-line when the first quarter ended.

The second quarter began with Clemson holding a one-point lead, although this would not last for long. Two plays into the quarter, Bulovas converted a 25-yard field goal to put Alabama in front by two points, 16–14. Clemson would soon recapture the lead, as Lawrence led the Tigers' offense down the field in six plays; the drive was capped by a one-yard touchdown rush by Travis Etienne. With the Clemson lead at 21–16, Alabama began their next drive. The Clemson defense would make another important play, as Tagovailoa threw his second interception of the game and only his sixth all season. Clemson then capitalized with a five-yard pass from Lawrence to Etienne to make push the lead to 12 points, 28–16. On what would be their last drive of the half, Alabama punted on 4th-and-17, giving Clemson the ball on their own 21-yard-line. With just over two minutes on the clock, Clemson drove down the field and converted a 36-yard field goal that put the lead at 31–16 and gave the Tide the ball back with 45 seconds. After an incomplete pass and a six-yard rush, Alabama head coach Nick Saban elected to let the clock expire and head to halftime trailing by fifteen.

On Alabama's first drive of the second half, they gained 53 yards on 12 plays before losing two yards on a fake field goal, turning the ball over on downs and giving the Tigers the football on their own 24-yard-line. Clemson took advantage of the Tide's mistake, scoring on a 74-yard Trevor Lawrence pass to Justyn Ross. Greg Huegel's extra point attempt hit the left upright, leaving the score at 37–16; it was only his second missed extra point of the season. Alabama's next drive spanned 59 yards before they failed to convert a 4th-and-4 on Clemson's 14-yard-line, giving the Tigers the ball with just under six minutes to play in the third quarter. Clemson took advantage, driving 89 yards for a touchdown with a five-yard touchdown catch by Tee Higgins; the successful extra point pushing their lead to 44–16. Alabama's 28-point deficit was the largest in any game under Saban, their coach since 2007. The Tide began their third drive of the second half on their 25-yard-line following a touchback.

Following a 48-yard pass from Tagovailoa to Jeudy on the final play of the third quarter, Alabama started the fourth quarter with a first down on Clemson's 27-yard-line. However, Alabama's offense stalled again, losing seven yards on 4th-and-goal from Clemson's 2-yard-line; this was the Tide's third straight turnover on downs, with all three coming in Clemson territory. Clemson was then unable to take advantage of their possession, and punted for the first time since the first quarter; the punt was downed at Alabama's 48-yard-line. Alabama began their fourth second-half drive with just over eleven minutes on the clock and Jalen Hurts at quarterback; it ended in a three-and-out, and Mike Bernier's punt was downed at the Clemson one-yard-line. After draining more than seven minutes on the clock and with the ball on Alabama's 17-yard-line, the majority of Clemson's offensive starters were removed from the game and Chase Brice was put in at quarterback. Clemson used up the remaining two minutes off the clock and took a knee on the final play ending the longest drive (10:02) in Clemson history and winning the National Championship, their second title in three years.

Scoring summary

Source:

Statistics

Source:

Broadcasting
The game was televised nationally by ESPN, with Megacast coverage across all of its networks except ABC. As in 2018, the network also promoted an off-site concert that was televised at halftime during ESPN's broadcast, featuring rock band Imagine Dragons, including a "special collaboration" with rapper Lil Wayne, on Treasure Island. Fans in attendance at Levi's Stadium saw the Clemson University Tiger Band and Alabama's Million Dollar Band perform.

See also
 College football national championships in NCAA Division I FBS
 Alabama–Clemson football rivalry
 Super Bowl 50, the NFL championship game contested at the same venue on February 7, 2016

Notes

References

External links

Box score at ESPN
Alabama roster at coed.com
Clemson roster at coed.com

National Championship
College Football Playoff National Championship
2019 in sports in California
Alabama Crimson Tide football bowl games
American football in the San Francisco Bay Area
Clemson Tigers football bowl games
January 2019 sports events in the United States
Sports competitions in Santa Clara, California
American football competitions in California